The river sternwheeler Ramona operated from 1892 to 1908 on the Willamette River in Oregon, on the Stikine River running from Wrangell, Alaska into British Columbia, and the Fraser River, in British Columbia.   This vessel should not be confused with the coastal steamship Ramona which also ran in Alaskan waters.

Construction 
Ramona was built at Portland, Oregon in 1892, and was reconstructed and enlarged in 1896. The vessel was built for the Graham steamboat line, formally called the Oregon City Transportation Company, but also known as the “Yellow Stack Line”.  All the steamers of the line had names that ended in -ona: Latona, Ramona, Altona, Leona, Pomona, Oregona, and Grahamona.

Ramona was specially fitted for passenger service, and was reported to have the best cabin of any steamer operating on the Willamette.

Willamette river service 
From 1892 to 1898 Ramona was worked on the Willamette River.  Until 1894, the vessel was run on the lower Willamette from Portland to Oregon City.  After 1894 Ramona was transferred to service on the upper Willamette, that is, the portion of the river above Willamette Falls.    For most of the first three years of operation, Captain A.J. Sprong was in command, with Horace Campbell serving as chief engineer and E. Wynkoop as purser.

One important landing on the Willamette was the Trade Street dock at Salem, Oregon, which was used by Ramona and other steamboats.  By the late 1890s however the once-booming steamboat business at Salem was falling off, as railroads began carrying the agricultural product that had once been shipped on the river.

Stikine river operations 

In 1898, with the coming of the Alaska Gold Rush, Ramona was sent north to Alaska to run on the Stikine River, where there was an effort being made to develop an alternative "All-Canadian" route to the Klondike gold fields.  Ramona went aground on the Stikine and had to be towed off by the Canadian Pacific Railway 's sternwheeler Ogilvie.  This was a common type of experience on the Stikine, which was a difficult river to navigate.  By the summer of 1898, the Stikine route had failed due to the extreme difficulty of reaching gold fields overland from the steamboat terminus.

Fraser river service 

Ramona was transferred to the Fraser River to replace the steamer Edgar.  On April 17, 1901, while in service on the Fraser River, Ramonas boiler exploded, killing at least four people.  The incident occurred at Fort Langley. Two were mothers who had gone on deck for fresh air.  They were blown off the boat into the river where they presumably drowned.  They had both left their babies in the main cabin; these infants were unharmed.  Two deckhands were killed by flying pieces of the boiler.  Contemporaneous reports stated that seven additional people suffered what appeared to be fatal injuries.

Disposition 

Ramona was repaired following the boiler explosion and returned to service.  In October 1903 Ramona struck the Mission railway bridge, but was again repaired and returned to service.  Ramona sank on April 22, 1908 at Wharton's Landing near the mouth of the Harrison River.  The report of the Canadian steamboat inspector summarized the incident:

Historian Affleck stated that Ramona was "an accident-prone steamer."

Notes

References 
 Affleck, Edward L., A Century of Paddlewheelers in the Pacific Northwest, the Yukon, and Alaska, Alexander Nicholls Press, Vancouver, BC 2000 
 Mills, Randall V., Sternwheelers up Columbia, Univ. of Nebraska (1947; 1977 printing) 
 Newell, Gordon R., ed., H.W. McCurdy Marine History of the Pacific Northwest, Superior Publishing, Seattle, WA 1966
 Timmen, Fritz Blow for the Landing: A Hundred Years of Steam Navigation on the Waters of the West, Caxton Printers, Caldwell, ID 1973 
 Turner, Robert D., Sternwheelers and Steam Tugs: An Illustrated History of the Canadian Pacific Railway 's British Columbia Lake and River Service, Soni Nis Press, Victoria BC 1984 
 Wright, E.W., ed., Lewis and Dryden Marine History of the Pacific Northwest, Lewis and Dryden Publishing Co., Portland, OR 1895.

Further reading 
 Corning, Howard McKinley, Willamette Landings, Oregon Historical Society (2d Ed. 1973)

External links 
 Green, Virginia, Salem 's Steamboats, Salem History On-line, Salem Public Library.
 Lake Oswego Public Library collection of steamboat photographs and other historic images of the Willamette river.

Steamboats of Oregon
Paddle steamers of British Columbia
Steamboats of the Willamette River
Passenger ships of the United States
Passenger ships of Canada
Ships built in Portland, Oregon
Steamboats of the Stikine River
1892 ships
Oregon City Transportation Company